Moniliformin  is an unusual mycotoxin, a feed contaminant that is lethal to fowl, especially ducklings.

Moniliformin is formed in many cereals by a number of Fusarium species that include Fusarium moniliforme, Fusarium avenaceum, Fusarium subglutinans, Fusarium proliferatum, Fusarium fujikuroi and others. It is mainly cardiotoxic and causes ventricular hypertrophy. 
Moniliformin actually causes competitive inhibition of the activity of pyruvate dehydrogenase complex of respiratory reaction, which prevents pyruvic acid, product of glycolysis, to convert to acetyl CoA. Ultrastructural examination of right ventricular wall of 9 month old female mink (Mustela vison) fed acute doses of moniliformin (2.2 and 2.8 mg/kg diet) and sub-acute doses (1.5 to 3.2 mg/kg diet) reveals significant damage to myofiber, mitochondria, Z and M lines and sarcoplasmic reticulum as well as increased extracellular collagen deposition. Mink is considered most sensitive mammals to the toxicity of moniliformin.
Chemically speaking, it is the sodium salt of deoxysquaric acid

Physicochemical information

IUPAC name: 3-hydroxy-3-cyclobutene-1,2-dione. Solubility information: Moniliformin is soluble in water and polar solvents, such as methanol.
λmax: 226, 259  in methanol

See also
Mycotoxin
Squaric acid

Sources and references

Mycotoxins
Organic sodium salts
Cyclobutenes
Respiratory toxins
Enols
Ketones
Organic acids